GamCare is an independent UK charity founded by Paul Bellringer in 1997 to raise awareness and aid those affected by problem gambling across Britain.

Overview 
GamCare operates a variety of services for problem gamblers and to the people whose lives are impacted by a problem gambler. The organization operates the National Gambling HelpLine on Freephone or via web chat through their website, provides online help and free face-to-face treatment across England, Scotland and Wales through a partner network.

GamCare also provides training and materials to the gambling industry to improve social responsibility and player protection. Training programs provide attendees with vital insights on how to recognize the signs of problem gambling behavior and advice on how to interact with players to achieve a positive outcome.

The Safer Gambling Standard 

The Safer Gambling Standard is the social responsibility quality standard for licensed gambling operators. The Standard is a set of best practice standards developed out of a combination of academic evidence in Responsible Gambling practices, GamCare service user input, and GamCare’s knowledge and experience from over 20 years of work with those affected by problem gambling, and the gambling industry itself.

GamCare Youth Services 
GamCare hosts Youth Outreach Programs, offering interactive workshops for young people, as well as training for the professionals that support them (such as teachers and youth workers).

GamCare and Samaritans together developed a suite of training materials for gambling businesses, to raise awareness of the risk of gambling-related suicide and to give gambling staff the skills and confidence to support customers who may be at risk.

See also 
Gamblers Anonymous
Problem gambling
UK Gambling Commission

References

External links 
GamCare Website

Charities based in London
Problem gambling organizations
Social welfare charities based in the United Kingdom